Sônia Hess de Souza (Luiz Alves, SC, born 1959) is a Brazilian businesswoman, vice-president of  the Women Group of Brazil, and former president of shirt company Dudalina. Her parents are Duda and Adelina, she is the second oldest child among 16 siblings. She left home at 17 to study in Spain. On her return, she stayed in São Paulo, where she was responsible for Dudalina's marketing area. Sônia took over the company in 2003 and was responsible for an annual growth of 30% of the brand since 2009. In 2013, she was elected by the American magazine Forbes as the sixth most powerful business woman in Brazil.

References 

Living people
1959 births
20th-century Brazilian businesswomen
20th-century Brazilian businesspeople
Brazilian marketing people
People from Santa Catarina (state)
21st-century Brazilian businesswomen
21st-century Brazilian businesspeople